Trifun Mihailović (Serbian Cyrillic: Трифун Михаиловић; born 10 March 1947) is a Serbian retired professional footballer.

Known for his short stature and by his nickname of Trifke, Mihailović scored the first official goal at the newly-opened Red Star Stadium in a youth match between Red Star Belgrade and Jedinstvo Zemun in 1963.

Notes

References

External links
 Trifun Mihailović at worldfootball.net

1947 births
Living people
Footballers from Belgrade
Yugoslav footballers
Serbian footballers
Yugoslav expatriate footballers
Serbian expatriate footballers
Association football forwards
Red Star Belgrade footballers
Serbian White Eagles FC players
SK Rapid Wien players
Yugoslav First League players
Expatriate footballers in Austria
Expatriate soccer players in Canada
Canadian National Soccer League players